The 1995 Coppa Italia Final decided the winner of the 1994–95 Coppa Italia. It was held on 7 and 11 June 1995 between Juventus and Parma. The first leg at the Stadio delle Alpi in Turin was the smallest difference won by Juventus after a goal by Sergio Porrini. The second leg was played at the Stadio Ennio Tardini in Parma won again by Juventus from another Porrini goal followed by his teammate Fabrizio Ravanelli for a 3–0 aggregate win.

A month earlier, both teams had faced off in the 1995 UEFA Cup Final, in which Parma won 2–1 on aggregate.

First leg

Second leg

References

External links
Italy - Coppa Italia History at RSSSF.com
Italy - List of Cup Finals at RSSSF.com

Coppa Italia Finals
Coppa Italia Final 1995
Coppa Italia Final 1995